Walsall railway station is the principal railway station of Walsall, West Midlands, England and situated in the heart of the town. It is operated by West Midlands Trains, with services provided by West Midlands Railway and from 2019, London Northwestern Railway operate a service from Rugeley to London Euston that calls at the station. The main entrance is situated inside the Saddlers Shopping Centre.

Overview 

The station has three platforms:
Platform 1: operating northbound services to Rugeley;
Platform 2: operating southbound, semi-fast services from Rugeley to Birmingham New Street;
Platform 3: (a terminus platform) operating local services to Wolverhampton via Birmingham New Street.

Platforms 2 and 3 have been recently refurbished, with a new waiting room added and poems on the walls of the stairs to the platforms. The mainline platforms are electrified to 25 kV AC Overhead power.

A self-service ticket machine was placed on Platform 1 but was no longer in place in April 2011; however, a similar machine remains in the station booking hall which is at street level above platform 3. The station has a staffed ticket office.

Services 

Until May 2019, Walsall unlike other stations in the West Midlands, was not very well served in terms of a mainline connection as it formerly had services to Wolverhampton, Wellington and Stafford but all these were withdrawn in 2008 due to low numbers and resulting in Walsall losing its connection to Shropshire and Staffordshire. Only a direct service from Wolverhampton to Walsall calls now at 6.00am Saturday morning but one way only. Walsall retains close connections to Rugeley Trent Valley for the West Coast Main Line and there were three services a day to Stafford but only on the peak services to Liverpool Lime Street. This service has since been discontinued after the May 2019 timetable change. However connections can be made at either Birmingham New Street or Rugeley Trent Valley for services to Liverpool Lime Street.

There were also two morning services a day to Telford and Shrewsbury via Birmingham and Wolverhampton. This service was also introduced in the timetable change in May 2019. They were operated as extensions of the Shrewsbury to Birmingham Line. This replaced the former Liverpool Lime Street service. However in December 2019, following problems with services and disruptions, the Walsall service was once again withdrawn. This was replaced by a through Rugeley Trent Valley to Wolverhampton service.

Monday to Saturday daytimes four trains per hour run south from Walsall to Birmingham New Street (two fast and two stopping) with most of the all stations services continuing past Birmingham to form the Birmingham to Wolverhampton stopping service.

From Walsall to Rugeley Trent Valley the service is half-hourly.

There is also a service to London which calls at all stations on the Chase Line and then from Walsall to Birmingham before continuing to Coventry, Rugby, Hampton-in-Arden, Northampton, Milton Keynes and London Euston.

There were plans to introduce direct services to London Euston operated by Avanti West Coast in 2021, however this has not yet materialised.

History

The Grand Junction Railway provided the town with its first rail service, albeit indirectly from 1837. Their Birmingham to Warrington line passed to the south and was provided with a station at Bescot Bridge (near the present ), from where travellers could catch a connecting stagecoach. The Grand Junction company laid a branch line from Bescot to a temporary depot in the town at Bridgeman Place a decade later, but it was not until 9 April 1849 that a permanent station was opened on the present site. Further route development followed - the SSR added a branch northwards to Cannock in 1858 (which was extended to Rugeley the following autumn), whilst the Wolverhampton and Walsall Railway line linked the town to Wolverhampton via North Walsall in 1872. The network was completed by the Midland Railway, whose line from  via  opened in 1879. The Midland had by this time also purchased the W&WR from the rival London and North Western Railway, though the LNWR still ran occasional services over it until the 1923 Grouping. The station was rebuilt in 1883, due to increasing traffic levels, with five platforms and separate booking offices for each of the two companies using it. A fire damaged the main booking hall in 1916, but it was not until after the World War I had ended in 1918 that a full rebuild of the concourse could be effected. The new booking hall was completed & opened in 1923.

Under LMS auspices, the Midland line to Wolverhampton via Wednesfield and Willenhall Stafford Street closed to passengers in 1931 (it being less direct than the older Grand Junction line via Darlaston).

The line from Birmingham was electrified in 1966 as part of the London Midland Region's electrification programme. The actual energization of the line from Coventry to Walsall through Aston took place on 15 August 1966.

In the late 1980s and into the 1990s, vast improvements were made to the quality of services from Walsall. In April 1989 passenger services were reintroduced by British Rail on the previously freight only line to Hednesford 24 years after they were withdrawn. The number of trains to Birmingham was gradually increased from one to four trains per hour and the Hednesford service was extended to Rugeley in 1997 (and subsequently through to Stafford) but the service to Stafford was cut back in 2008 to Rugeley Trent Valley under an agreement with London Midland and WCML operators. Only the now withdrawn daily Liverpool Lime Street services connected Walsall directly with Stafford.

Passenger services to Wolverhampton were reintroduced in 1998 which also ran on occasions to Wellington, but this service was short lived and the regular hourly service was withdrawn again in 2008 due to low passenger numbers. However, one train per day ran straight to Wolverhampton from Walsall, in the evening (leaving Walsall at 19.36) until the May 2013 timetable change as a parliamentary train to avoid the need for formal closure proceedings.  This now runs in the opposite direction on Saturdays only (06.38 ex-Wolverhampton). The West Midlands Combined Authority still has ambitions to reinstate a regular (half-hourly) weekday service on the route and reopen the station at Willenhall and Darlaston, but funding problems have precluded any action being taken on the proposals.

Incidents 

On 23 December 1854 a double headed south-bound goods train from the north was held outside the station, with a second goods train drawn up behind it. A third goods train collided with the rear of the second, at speed, forcing it into the first. The fireman of the second of the engines of the third train, on his first turn in the role, was killed after jumping from his engine. The driver of the leading engine was charged with manslaughter. The case against him was dropped.

Beeching Axe and closures

The service to Rugeley Trent Valley was also closed to passengers on the same date, leaving towns like Bloxwich, Cannock, Hednesford and Rugeley without a railway connection. The remaining service to Birmingham was also reduced to hourly in the 1970s and almost withdrawn until it was saved and later improved.

The section to Lichfield remained open to freight traffic until 1984, when the line from Ryecroft Junction to Newtown, Brownhills closed to all traffic and the line was lifted and the stations (except Hammerwich) were demolished. The section from Newtown, Brownhills continued to serve Charringtons Oil Terminal until the closure of the terminal in 2001. The line was then mothballed and put out of use. 

The section to Stourbridge remained open to serve as a diversion for freight and served the now-demolished Dudley Freightliner Terminal until 1993, when the route between Bescot/Walsall and the Round Oak steel terminal was taken out of use and mothballed.

Future proposals

Proposals would see the reintroduction of services to Wolverhampton via Willenhall with new stations at Darlaston (James Bridge) and Willenhall operated by West Midland Railway giving commuters a faster service to Wolverhampton as opposed to the current service via Birmingham New Street.

There are also plans to reopen a terminus single platform at Aldridge for trains to Birmingham New Street via Walsall but not to Sutton Coldfield and Water Orton.

In a strategy which has been conducted by the West Midlands Combined Authority, the line from Walsall to Lichfield has been identified as a disused rail corridor and this means that it is a long term ambition to reopen the line from Walsall to Lichfield, either a rail/light rail corridor. There are also aspirations to reconnect the disused line at Wednesbury to Walsall as either rail or tram.

Walsall would receive new direct services, run by Avanti West Coast, to London Euston.

Gallery

References

External links 

 History of Walsall's train station

Railway stations in Walsall
DfT Category D stations
Former London and North Western Railway stations
Railway stations in Great Britain opened in 1849

Railway stations served by West Midlands Trains
1849 establishments in England